José Fernando González Quinones (born June 19, 1950) is a retired Major League Baseball infielder. After the end of his major league career, he spent one season with the St. Lucie Legends of the Senior Professional Baseball Association. He batted and threw right-handed.

Career
He had two pinch hit at-bats, and struck out both times. Though they weren't teammates very long, González was part of several search parties that went looking for Roberto Clemente's body after Clemente's plane crashed on New Year's Eve, 1972, as he'd grown up idolizing Clemente.

He split the  season between the Pirates and triple A Charleston Charlies, batting .224 with five runs batted in at the major league level and hitting his first major league home run on May 27 off the Houston Astros' Dave Roberts. After the season, he and pitcher Nelson Briles were traded to the Kansas City Royals for Kurt Bevacqua, Ed Kirkpatrick and minor leaguer Winston Cole.

He appeared in just nine games for the Royals when he was optioned to triple A Omaha on May 3 to make room for George Brett on the major league roster. Two days later, his contract was sold to the New York Yankees. In his only season in New York City, González batted .215 backing up Sandy Alomar Sr. at second base. He failed to make the club out of Spring training the following year, and was released. He caught on with the Petroleros Poza Rica of the Mexican League before signing a minor league deal with the Pirates on July 17, .

He spent the entire season in the majors, batting a career high .276 with four home runs and 27 RBIs. He got most of his playing time at third base, but he also played some outfield and second as well. As a pinch hitter, he was 10-for-27 with nine RBIs.

He was selected by the San Diego Padres June 5, and took over as the club's starting second baseman.

His fortunes turned around pretty immediately with his new club. González had a two home run game against the Chicago Cubs on July 14 (his only two of the season and the fifth & sixth of his career), and completely tore up his old club when the Pirates came to San Diego for a three-game set later in the month (four-for-ten with four RBIs to help his team sweep the series). He batted .250 for the Padres in 1978. Coupled with Ozzie Smith at shortstop, he also provided his club with one of the steadier defenses up the middle in the National League (.982 fielding percentage).

His final season in the majors was arguably his best. Regardless, the Padres acquired former All-Star second baseman Dave Cash from the Montreal Expos during the off-season, and released González. During the  season, he returned to Mexico, and competed in the Mexican league until , when he returned to the Yankees organization as a member of the Southern League's Nashville Sounds as a player/coach.

See also
 List of Major League Baseball players from Puerto Rico

References

External links
, or Sports Illustrated

1950 births
Living people
Alijadores de Tampico players
Cafeteros de Córdoba players
Charleston Charlies players
Clinton Pilots players
Columbus Clippers players
Diablos Rojos del México players
Kansas City Royals players
Major League Baseball players from Puerto Rico
Major League Baseball second basemen
Major League Baseball shortstops
Major League Baseball third basemen
Nashville Sounds players
New York Yankees players
People from Utuado, Puerto Rico
Petroleros de Poza Rica players
Pittsburgh Pirates players
Puerto Rican expatriate baseball players in Mexico
Salem Rebels players
San Diego Padres players
Salt Lake City Gulls players
Sherbrooke Pirates players
Sultanes de Monterrey players
Syracuse Chiefs players